The Brazilian company Indústrias Reunidas Frateschi (known as Frateschi) is a model railroad manufacturer based in Ribeirão Preto, near São Paulo, Brazil. Today Frateschi exports to Argentina, Canada, Chile, Colombia, Peru, Uruguay, United States, France, Spain, Switzerland, South Africa, China, Taiwan, New Zealand and Australia. Frateschi is the only model railroad manufacturer in South America.

History 

Founded in 1958 as a toy factory by Galileu Frateschi, the company originally produced stuffed animals and wooden furniture. This was followed by the first model railway products such as telephone poles and pylons. In 1967, the toy factory Frateschi has been renamed to "Indústrias Reunidas Frateschi Ltda" to concentrate fully on model trains with its core business focused on Brazilian railways (RFFSA, Fepasa, CPEF, EFS, etc.). In 1993 started a cooperation with Atlas and exported to the United States. The company annually organizes summits to promote the brand and gather model railroaders in cities such as Ribeirao Preto, Campinas and São Carlos. The last one in 2017 (13th edition) was held in Bebedouro - SP.

Products 

Frateschi produces only HO scale models. The range includes locomotives, passenger and freight cars, railway tracks, and building kits.

Locomotives 
In March 2015 the following models were produced by Frateschi :

An interesting note on the FA-1 locomotive painted for the Reading Railroad. Frateschi picked the RDG 305 for the prototype. This locomotive had been wreck repaired and was painted incorrectly. The green stripe with gold pinstripes should only run down on the nose. The shop had incorrectly also had the stripe turn up on the nose somewhat creating a diamond around the company’s diamond logo

References 

Model railroad manufacturers
Model manufacturers of Brazil
Companies based in São Paulo (state)
Brazilian brands